The Bishop's Stortford High School (often abbreviated to TBSHS) is a comprehensive secondary school, with a coeducational sixth form, in Bishop's Stortford, Hertfordshire, England. The school admits boys aged 11 to 16 in the first five forms, with a mixed sixth form of boys and girls aged 16 to 18. The school has specialisms in Mathematics and Computing, focusing on these areas as well as music, drama and sport, possessing state-of-the-art in-house computing facilities and providing assistance to local schools in this area. The current Headmaster, Mr D Reeve, was appointed in January 2014.

History
From the 1980s onwards the school extensively added to its original buildings; a dedicated Sixth Form Centre was built and the Turing Suite (an extensive computing and ICT facility, named after Alan Turing) was constructed. A drama studio named 'Broadway' and an on-site sports pavilion were also added to the school, in addition to the set of playing fields at Jobber's Wood. The school site also has 'Newton', a combined Design technology, Science and Languages block named after Sir Isaac Newton, which opened in 1995.

Awards and recognition
Former Deputy Head Paul Noble was recognised as a regional winner in the 2000 BT Award for Most Creative Use of ICT – Secondary.

In 2003, two students from the school were national champions in the English-Speaking Union's Public Speaking Competition, winning the English national final out of a field of 500 schools. In the faceoff of the English, Irish, Scottish and Welsh national tournaments, Nick Devlin and Richard Goodman of The Bishop's Stortford High School were selected as champions and were awarded the Silver Mace.

A student from the school was a member of the four-person English team at the 15th World Schools Debating Championships in Lima, Peru.

On 5 November 2007 the school won the Becta award for ICT Excellence in Leadership and Management. The school was described as a "successful all-boys school".

Academic performance
Overall, the School was rated Very Good, point two on a seven-point scale, whilst the component 'Enrichment of the curriculum, including out-of-school activities' was rated Excellent, point one, by Ofsted in their report on 22 April 2005. In a subsequent inspection in 2008, the school was rated as Outstanding.

In an inspection report, independent government schools adjudicator Ofsted said: "This is a very good school which provides very good value for money and is highly thought of in the local community. The high quality of much of the teaching enables the students to achieve very well throughout the school. Standards are well above average by GCSE and above average in the sixth form."

In a more recent inspection on the 1–2 May 2013 and under a new scheme of inspection, the school was rated overall as Good with the category 'Behaviour and safety of pupils' being rated as Outstanding.

In the most recent inspection, performed in March 2017, the school was rated overall as Outstanding, with the report highlighting "high-quality teaching [that is]  typified by the exceptionally strong working relationships established between staff and pupils".

The most recent GCSE results certified the fact of the high importance and focus on maths within the school with TBSHS getting best boys school in the country for further maths at GCSE level and classed as one of the top 10 state schools in the country.

School organisation

Schools
In pastoral care the year groups (Years 7 to 11; 12 to 13) are grouped together into 'schools':
 Lower School (Years 7 and 8)
 Middle School (Years 9 and 10)
 Upper School (Years 11, 12 and 13)

Houses
There are six 'Houses'. These Houses centre on local areas or history in the town: Chantry, Dane, Meads, Shaw, Twyford and Waytemore. The Houses apply to all year groups, and individual pupils are assigned to a House.  Each House is also run by a teacher called a 'Head Of House'. 5 boys from each house represent the house as Captain, Deputy, Sports, Music/Drama, and Charity. Their job is to make sure their house is being run properly, such as 'house assemblies' and 'house meetings'. Every pupil, from year 9 onwards, has the opportunity to be awarded 'House Colours' for outstanding contributions to extracurricular activities, such as sport, music, drama and debating. Once students progress into the sixth form the House Colours are removed, however, they have the opportunity to earn School Colours.

Due to the ‘Black Lives Matter’ movement that began in 2020, the school decided to rename the Rhodes House (named after Cecil Rhodes) to the Shaw House, which is named after former Headmaster Ian Shaw who died in 2018.

Sixth Form
Every 'sixth former' is automatically appointed as a Prefect. However, only in the second year of student's Sixth Form career are they required to carry out break and lunch time duties, ensuring that the rules of school are enforced and that younger pupils do not go out of bounds. Unlike the Lower and Middle schools, the sixth form admits girls from the local area, with many coming from Hockerill or The Hertfordshire and Essex High School.

Extra-curricular activities
The Bishops Stortford High School has the reputation as being one of the best state schools in the South East of England for rugby union taking on and beating some of the best private schools in the country. The school's Parent Sports Association is actively involved with supporting sport within the school. The Rugby Union squad went on a tour of Australia in 2009 and again in 2012. In 2018 and 2022, the Rugby Union squad went on a tour of South Africa, playing against four teams, including the prestigious Paarl Boys' High School.

In addition to having a strong rugby focus, the school has multiple capable football sides ranging from Year 7 to Sixth Form. In 2016, the U15 side won the English Schools National Football Cup, compromising of 650 teams around England.

Interact is the school's awareness and fundraising organisation, serving as the hub of charity within the school. Founded by former headmaster Ian Shaw, and now overseen by Head of Religious Studies and Citizenship, Simon Etheridge, Interact has for many years been a core part of the school. Interact raises funds for both local and international charities as a branch of the Rotary Club. It is run by Sixth Form students, with students of all ages being welcome at events and meetings.

Notable former pupils

Ben Bowditch – footballer (Bishop's Stortford, formerly England Under 19 and Under 21)
Dean Bowditch – footballer (Milton Keynes Dons, formerly Ipswich Town)
George Sykes - footballer (Aveley, formerly Barnet and Scotland Under 19s)
Ed Drewett – pop musician who featured in Professor Green's "I Need You Tonight" that reached No 3 on the UK singles chart
Davood Ghadami – actor (EastEnders)
Greg James – Radio 1 DJ
Billy Price – actor
Ben Skirving – England rugby player
Timothy Smith – cricketer
Matthew Richards – footballer (Shrewsbury Town, former England U21)
Munroe Bergdorf - Activist and model -L'Oreal's first transgender model
 Benedict Cork - Singer, songwriter, musician
Zak Swanson- footballer for Portsmouth FC

References

External links
 TBSHS Website
 TBSHS Interact Website

Secondary schools in Hertfordshire
Boys' schools in Hertfordshire
Educational institutions established in 1950
1950 establishments in England
Foundation schools in Hertfordshire
Bishop's Stortford